Statistics of Football League First Division in the 1966–67 season.

Overview
Manchester United won the First Division title for the seventh time in the club's history that season. They made sure of that on 6 May, after beating West Ham United 6–1 at Upton Park whilst their title challengers Nottingham Forest lost 2–1 at Southampton. This would be their last league title for 26 years, and last in the First Division, until the inaugural 1992-93 Premier League season. Blackpool were relegated on 15 April, after losing 2–0 at Stoke City whilst Aston Villa joined them on 6 May, after losing 4–2 at home against Everton with Southampton's win against Nottingham Forest confirming their relegation.

League standings

Results

Top scorers

References

RSSSF

Football League First Division seasons
Eng
1966–67 Football League
1966–67 in English football leagues

lt:Anglijos futbolo varžybos 1966–1967 m.
hu:1966–1967-es angol labdarúgó-bajnokság (első osztály)
ru:Футбольная лига Англии 1966-1967